USS Jesse L. Brown (DE/FF/FFT-1089) was a  of the United States Navy. She was named for Jesse L. Brown, the first African-American naval aviator in the U.S. Navy. The ship was eventually decommissioned and sold to the Egyptian Navy and was renamed Damiyat (F961). The name is also transliterated as Damyat and Damietta by some sources.

History
Jesse L. Brown, a 3963-ton Knox-class escort ship built at Westwego, Louisiana, was commissioned in February 1973. In July 1975, she was reclassified as a frigate and designated FF-1089. Her career was spent with the Atlantic Fleet, and included several deployments to the Mediterranean Sea, the Persian Gulf and northern European waters. Jesse L. Brown also participated in two joint operations with Latin American Navies, UNITAS XX in 1979 and UNITAS XXX a decade later.

Jesse L. Brown was operating off the Guantanamo Bay area during January 1979 when  mistakenly fired upon a Soviet oceangoing tug and Foxtrot-class submarine being given to the Cuban Navy. Farragut mistook the radar return for the US Navy fleet tug and towed target. During the next approximate 48 hours, Jesse L. Brown and the other ships maintained General Quarters while a state of near war existed, which included constant threat of attack by Cuban missile patrol boats and medium bombers.

Jesse L. Brown (in an episode foreshadowing her later service) was credited with a drug bust as a result of the rescue of an approximate  sailboat in Casco Bay, Maine, while undergoing post yard refit sea trials from Bath Iron Works. The ship bears the marks of this operation to this day with visible dents in her hull from the strikes from the large sailboat while transferring the seasick crew in heavy sea conditions. The sailboat crew was later transferred to a former Navy ATF Coast Guard cutter out of Portland, Maine, after a failed towing attempt of the sailboat.

Jesse L. Browns motto was "Versatility, Victory, Valor!". In one episode during the Iranian Hostage Crisis, the ship recovered an SH-3 Sea King that couldn't refuel in flight and didn't have enough fuel to return to its carrier. Jesse L. Browns commanding officer ordered ship into the wind and recovered the Sea King onto the limited space flight deck, even though it was not rated for helicopters the size of the Sea King. Quick repairs by both the helicopter's and ship's crew remedied the helicopter's fuel problem, and it was able to lift off and properly refuel airborne.

Jesse L. Brown and her crew were the first ship to escort three Pegasus-class patrol hydrofoils from Roosevelt Roads, Puerto Rico, to Key West, Florida, by using her helicopter refueling system as an underway replenishment refueling rig to refuel the three hydrofoils underway.

Jesse L. Brown served as the U.S. liaison and on-scene commander for rescue attempts and subsequent body recovery for a diving bell from the Phillips Petroleum oil-exploration ship MV Woodeco 5 off the Ivory Coast in October 1979.

During the later 1980s and early 1990s, she engaged in counter-narcotics operations in the Caribbean area.

Jesse L. Brown was transferred to the Naval Reserve in January 1992, and was redesignated FFT-1089. She was actively involved in training reservists while participating in operations in the western Atlantic and the Gulf of Mexico area. In 1993, she transited the Panama Canal and paid a visit to Ecuador. Jesse L. Brown was decommissioned on 27 July 1994 and leased to the Egyptian Navy the same day. Named Damiyat (F961) in Egyptian service (but also transliterated as Damyat or Damietta in some sources), she was purchased outright by the Egyptians on 25 March 1998. , Damiyat remained active with the Egyptian Navy as seen making a sortie out of the harbour at Alexandria by cruise ship passengers.

Awards and decorations

References

External links
US Navy History – USS Jesse L. Brown images
USS Jesse L. Brown on NavSource.org

 

Knox-class frigates
Ships built in Bridge City, Louisiana
1972 ships
Cold War frigates and destroyer escorts of the United States
Knox-class frigates of the Egyptian Navy
Frigates of Egypt